Gustave Florent Marie Masselin (24 January 1867 – 11 October 1936) was a French fencer. He competed in the men's masters foil event at the 1900 Summer Olympics.

References

External links
 

1867 births
1936 deaths
French male foil fencers
Olympic fencers of France
Fencers at the 1900 Summer Olympics
People from Courbevoie
Sportspeople from Hauts-de-Seine